Bastiaan Veth (24 October 1891 – 3 August 1947) was a Dutch rower. He competed in the men's double sculls event at the 1920 Summer Olympics.

References

External links
 

1891 births
1947 deaths
Dutch male rowers
Olympic rowers of the Netherlands
Rowers at the 1920 Summer Olympics
Sportspeople from Dordrecht